Diamond Harbour Government Polytechnic, is a government polytechnic established in 2014 and located in Diamond Harbour,  South 24 Parganas district, West Bengal. This polytechnic is affiliated to the West Bengal State Council of Technical Education,  and recognized by AICTE, New Delhi. This polytechnic offers diploma courses in Food Processing Technology and Civil Engineering and Mechanical Engineering.

References

External links
 http://dhgpolytechnic.in/

Universities and colleges in South 24 Parganas district
Technical universities and colleges in West Bengal
2014 establishments in West Bengal
Diamond Harbour